The Ramstein Air Base meeting was an international conference organized by the United States that took place on 26 April 2022 at the Ramstein Air Base in Germany. The purpose of the meeting was to discuss the Russian invasion of Ukraine, particularly Ukrainian defense capabilities, as well as pledge and coordinate further support to Ukraine – including after the war. Representatives and senior defense officials from more than 40 nations attended, the majority of them NATO and EU members, but also including countries in Africa and Asia. 

The meeting was part of the Ukraine Defense Consultative Group, also known as the Ukraine Defense Contact Group, which has held 9 meetings, the most recent on 14 February 2023.

Participants and attendees
Over 40 nations were represented at the meeting, including both NATO and non-NATO members. All countries part of NATO and/or the European Union participated. Representatives from some nations, among them Israel and Qatar, participated at the meeting but did not appear on the official list of attendees.
According to the Washington Post, the inclusion of non-NATO member countries like Japan, Kenya and Tunisia was "part of an effort to extend substantive and symbolic support for Ukraine beyond Europe and the alliance". Other non-NATO and non-EU attendees included Australia, Jordan, Liberia, Morocco, New Zealand and South Korea.

The conference was organized with less than a week's notice. Despite not organized under NATO auspices, it was supposed to be attended by NATO Secretary General Jens Stoltenberg. However, he could not attend due to a cold. While most countries had attendees physically present, South Korea and Japan joined virtually.

Dignitaries in attendance
  – Defence Minister Oleksii Reznikov; Lt. Gen. Yevhen Moisiuk

NATO member states

Asia-Pacific partners

Middle Eastern partners

African partners

Meeting
At the meeting, Ukraine is said to have outlined its defense needs. Several nations announced new shipments of heavy weapons to Ukraine at Ramstein, including Germany and Canada.

U.S. Secretary of Defense Lloyd Austin, the organizer of the meeting, having visited Kyiv days earlier told the meeting that his "visit only underscored my sense of urgency, an urgency that I know that we all share", stating he would like "this whole group today to leave with a common and transparent understanding of Ukraine's near-term security requirements because we're going to keep moving heaven and earth so that we can meet them." Behind closed doors, general Mark Milley is reported to have stated that "the next two, three, four weeks will shape the overall outcome of this fight", stating "time is not on Ukraine's side". Austin also stated that the conference sought "to help Ukraine win the fight against Russia's unjust invasion and to build up Ukraine's defenses for tomorrow's challenges", and that "we do want to make it harder for Russia to threaten its neighbors and make it less able to do that." Austin also made a comment regarding a series of attacks that started the day before the meeting on 25 April in the Russian-backed breakaway republic of Transnistria, internationally recognized as part of Moldova. He more specifically declared that he was "not really sure what that's all about, but it's something that we will stay focused on".

Against a backdrop of domestic and international pressure, the German defence minister Christine Lambrecht announced at Ramstein that Gepard self-propelled anti-aircraft weapons were to be offered to Ukraine from industry stocks, stating "Germany, together with its allies, stands firmly at the side of its Ukrainian friends who are in dire need". This marked a major change in German policy, having previously hesitated in sending heavy weapons to Ukraine. Lambrecht also stated Ukrainian soldiers would be trained on the systems on German soil.

Aftermath and reactions
According to Secretary of Defense Austin, the conference is to be transformed into a monthly "contact group" on Ukraine's self-defense. Part of its focus is to organize co-operation in the fields of industry, to deal "with the tremendous demand that we’re facing for munitions and weapons platforms". It is to be open to any country willing to contribute to Ukrainian defense capabilities, and it is expected by the U.S. that more nations will join the upcoming meetings virtually.

After the meeting, the Ukrainian minister of defence, Oleksii Reznikov stated on Twitter that "We need weapons. Modern weapons. A large number of modern heavy weapons". He also called the conference a "momentous meeting", and that "tectonic philosophical shifts have occurred".

Marcel Dirsus, a nonresident fellow at the Institute for Security Policy at Kiel University, called the German statements at Ramstein a "strong signal" from Germany, after a recent string of contradictory statements and perceived reluctance.

The former Ukrainian ambassador to the United States, Volodymyr Yelchenko, has stated that the meeting may have marked the official founding of an "Anti-Putin Coalition". Ukrainian political scientist and Vice-Rector of the Ukrainian Catholic University, Dmytro Sherenhovskyy, stated that the meeting marked significant changes in international security architecture.

According to Euromaidan Press, "in some sense the Ramstein meeting demonstrates a gradual increase in the national leaders’ readiness to take responsibility in global leadership", also stating that "the meeting at the US Air Force base Ramstein has already been called historic for Ukraine."

Subsequent meetings

The last meeting took place on 20 January 2023 at Ramstein Air Base.

See also
European Control Center Ukraine
Ukraine Security Assistance Initiative

References

2022 conferences
2022 in international relations
Political conferences
Reactions to the 2022 Russian invasion of Ukraine
April 2022 events in Germany
21st century in Rhineland-Palatinate
Diplomatic conferences in Germany
Germany–Ukraine relations
Ukraine–NATO relations